Dámaso Berenguer y Fusté, 1st Count of Xauen (4 August 1873 – 19 May 1953) was a Spanish general and politician. He served as Prime Minister during the last thirteen months of the reign of Alfonso XIII.

Biography 
Berenguer was born in San Juan de los Remedios, Cuba, while the island was a Spanish administrative division.
He enlisted in the army in 1889, served in Cuba and Morocco.

He served in the Second Melillan campaign, taking part in the action of the Barranco del Lobo (1909).

He founded the Fuerzas Regulares Indígenas on 30 June 1911 and fought in the ensuing Kert campaign, leading the action that killed Riffian leader Mohamed Ameziane in 1912, bringing the end of the campaign. He was promoted to brigadier general in 1916, and, in 1918, to division general.
In 1918, he was appointed Minister of War under Prime Minister Manuel García Prieto.

He was appointed January 1919 as High Commissioner of Spain in Morocco. He proceeded to occupy Chaouen on 14 October 1920, and Berenguer, one of the leading protegees of Alfonso XIII in Africa along Manuel Fernández Silvestre, was granted the nobiliary title of Count of Xauen in reward.

The disaster for the Spanish Army in Morocco in the summer of 1921, which included the defeat at the Battle of Annual and the ensuing slaughter of about 2,000 Spanish soldiers in Monte Arruit, murdered by the Riffians after their surrender, delivered a coup de grâce to the regime of the Restoration. The armed forces was deeply divided between africanistas vs. junteros and responsibilists vs. impunists. Berenguer sanctioned the  use of chemical weapons against civilians during the Rif War, stating in a telegram to the War Minister in August 1921 that "I have been obstinately refractary to the use of suffocating gases against these indigenous peoples but after what they have done, and of their treacherous and deceptive conduct, I have to use them with true joy."

After three previous rejected attempts to hand in his resignation as High Commissioner, he finally did so by mid 1922. An official investigation carried out by General Picasso had already been opened to determine responsibility for the disastrous military strategy vis-à-vis the 1921 collapse, and Berenguer, in his capacity as High Commissioner, found himself among those martialled.

Amid the structural collapse of the Restoration regime, by the summer of 1923, plotting took place in the military. In September 1923 a pronunciamiento by Miguel Primo de Rivera took place in Barcelona, bringing the dictatorship of Primo de Rivera, as the king appointed the former as Prime Minister after the success of the coup d'état. Yet, ultimately, despite their differences, they shared the same contempt for what they thought to be persecution of the military by the government due to Annual.

Despite attempts to bring the process to a halt by Primo de Rivera (he even attempted to confiscate the report), the trial on the performance of Berenguer and Navarro began on 16 June 1924. Attempting to pander to the military, Primo de Rivera amnestied Berenguer.

In 1926, Berenguer became Chief of Staff of the Military House of the King, a post conventionally destined to burned-out generals liked by Alfonso XIII in order to move them away from the spotlight for a time.

In January 1930, following the forced resignation of Primo de Rivera, Alfonso XIII tasked Berenguer with the formation of a government seeking to restore the country to its pre-1923 state, as if nothing had happened in between. During his mandate as prime minister, Berenguer repealed some of the harsher measures introduced by Primo de Rivera, earning his regime the nickname dictablanda (the toothless dictatorship, blanda meaning soft, as opposed to the preceding dictadura, dura being the Spanish word for hard).

He also faced a number of problems, such as increasing demands for the abolition of the monarchy, disorganisation among the country's political parties after seven years of repression making the calling of prompt elections an impossible task, labour unrest, and at least one military uprising. One of the last straws nailing the coffin of the monarchist regime was an article titled "el error Berenguer" (the Berenguer mistake), authored by Ortega y Gasset in El Sol, which famously ended with "Delenda est monarchia".

Berenguer resigned as prime minister on 14 February 1931; he was replaced by Admiral Juan Bautista Aznar-Cabañas, under whom he served as Minister of War. Two months later, Alfonso fled the country and the Republic was declared. Berenguer was tried on his performance in Morocco and irregularities in the repression of the 1930 Jaca uprising. He was cleared in 1935 and retired from public life.

He died in Madrid in 1953.

References
Citations

Bibliography
 
 
 
 
 
 
 
 
 
 
 

1873 births
1953 deaths
People from Remedios, Cuba
Prime Ministers of Spain
Spanish generals
People of the Rif War
Spanish military personnel of the Second Melillan campaign
Spanish military personnel of the Kert campaign
Defence ministers of Spain
Spanish people in Spanish Cuba